Beyk Kandi (also Romanized as Beyk Kandī; also known as Beyg Kandī and Beyg Kandī Rūd) is a village in Qaranqu Rural District, in the Central District of Hashtrud County, East Azerbaijan Province, Iran. At the 2006 census, its population was 593, in 133 families.

References 

Towns and villages in Hashtrud County